Black is Beltza is a 2018 2D adult animated drama film directed by Fermín Muguruza (in his directorial debut) from a screenplay by Muguruza, Harkaitz Cano and Eduard Sola, based on the graphic novel of the same name by Muguruza, Cano and Jorge Alderet. A co-production by Setmàgic Audiovisual and Talka Records and Films, the soundtrack was composed by Muguruza, a Basque rock musician, and Raül Refree, a Spanish record producer. The film was released in Spain on 5 October 2018, and was nominated for Best Animated Feature at the Gaudí Awards.

Premise 

In October 1965, a group of processional giants, inspired by parades in Pamplona, is  invited to march down New York’s 5th Avenue on Hispanic Day. But the racial discrimination policies, two black giants are not allowed in the parade. Debarring from this true-event, which happened  a few months after Malcolm X’s death the story turns on Manex, a young Basque who travels to New York to walk inside one of the carnival giants.

Manex will be an inadvertent witness to some of the most remarkable events and actors from the last decades: Racial riots, the Black Panthers, the Cuban Revolution, Cold War spy games, which all make for a colourful portrait of the ’60s counterculture era.

Accolades 
Released in Spain on 5 October 2018, Black is Beltza was nominated for two accolades:

Sequel 
A sequel, titled Black Is Beltza II: Ainhoa is set to be released in 2022. It will follow Ainhoa, the daughter of Manex, who has inherited his social commitment and taste for adventure.

References

External links 
 (in Spanish)
English version

2018 films
2018 animated films
Spanish animated films
Animated feature films
Adult animated films
Animated thriller films
Animated drama films
Films about racism